Guido Andreozzi and Eduardo Schwank were the defending champions, but Guido Andreozzi decided not to compete alongside Schwank. Schwank played alongside Bagnis

Facundo Bagnis and Eduardo Schwank won the title, defeating Nicolás Barrientos and Eduardo Struvay in the final, 6–3, 6–3.

Seeds

Draw

Draw

References
 Main Draw

Seguros Bolivar Open Cali - Doubles
2014 Doubles
2014 in Colombian tennis